Gonzalo Sorondo Amaro (born October 9, 1979) is a Uruguayan former footballer who last played for Defensor.

He has earned 27 caps for his country, and played for them at the 2002 FIFA World Cup.

He acquired Brazilian citizenship on September 3, 2009.

Career

Club
Sorondo began his career with Uruguayan club Defensor Sporting Club, moving to Inter Milan in 2001, playing 11 Serie A games on his first season and none in 2002-2003. By 2003 he was on loan to Belgian club Standard Liège. Crystal Palace took him on loan in August 2004 where he played in the Premier League. A year later another loan, this time to Charlton, was confirmed in July 2005 after he obtained a work permit. At the summer of 2006 he became a free agent, and signed a permanent contract with Charlton. Sorondo was released by Charlton Athletic alongside compatriot Omar Pouso in February 2007 after just one Premier League appearance. He returned to Defensor.

In early 2012, Sorondo, was hired to play Grêmio, from Porto Alegre but during the preseason he had rupture of the anterior cruciate ligament in his right knee and had his contract terminated with the team.

International
Sorondo played at the  1999 FIFA World Youth Championship, in which Uruguay finished in 4th.

He was a regular member of the Uruguay national team, making his debut against Colombia, the August 15, 2000, and played for his country in the 2002 FIFA World Cup, but has consistently been dropped in recent years, due to injuries and limited league appearances.

References

External links
 
 lequipe
CBF

1979 births
Living people
Footballers from Montevideo
Naturalized citizens of Brazil
Uruguayan footballers
Uruguayan expatriate footballers
Uruguayan expatriate sportspeople in Italy
Uruguayan expatriate sportspeople in Belgium
Uruguayan expatriate sportspeople in England
Uruguayan expatriate sportspeople in Brazil
Defensor Sporting players
Inter Milan players
Standard Liège players
Crystal Palace F.C. players
Charlton Athletic F.C. players
Sport Club Internacional players
Grêmio Foot-Ball Porto Alegrense players
Uruguay under-20 international footballers
Uruguay international footballers
2001 Copa América players
2002 FIFA World Cup players
Uruguayan Primera División players
Serie A players
Belgian Pro League players
Premier League players
Campeonato Brasileiro Série A players
Association football defenders
Expatriate footballers in Belgium
Expatriate footballers in Brazil
Expatriate footballers in England
Expatriate footballers in Italy